Rossendale Rugby Football Club is an English rugby union team based in Rawtenstall, Rossendale, Lancashire. The club runs three senior sides, a colts team, and eleven junior sides. The first XV currently play in the Regional 1 North West.

Honours
 North-West North 1 champions: 1990–91
 North Lancs/Cumbria champions: 2004–05
 North Lancashire/Cumbria v South Lancs/Cheshire 1 promotion play-off winner: 2007–08
 North 2 (east v west) promotion play-off winner: 2008–09

References

External links
 Official club website

English rugby union teams
Rugby clubs established in 1969
Sport in the Borough of Rossendale
Rugby union in Lancashire